Güzelyurt, formerly Gelveri (Cappadocian Greek: Καρβάλη), is a town in Aksaray Province in the Central Anatolia region of Turkey, at a distance of  from the city of Aksaray. It is the seat of Güzelyurt District. Its population is 2,570 (2021).

This area is part of the ancient region of Cappadocia, near the Ihlara Valley.

History
Cappadocia has an important place in the history of Christianity and Gregory of Nazianzus lived in the area. A historically large native Cappadocian Greek population existed in the area until the 1924 population exchange (see Cappadocian Greeks), when they were replaced with the Turks from Thessaloniki and Kavala. The monastery, churches, refuge caves, and mansions attest to the culture of the indigenous Cappadocian Greek population.

Places of interest
Güzelyurt is known for having three underground cities and over 50 churches carved into the rocky volcanic landscape including:
 Ihlara Valley
 Monastery Valley, "Manastır Vadisi"
 Fairy Chimneys, "Peri Bacaları"
 Antique Greek houses
 Ahmatlı Church
 St. Anargiros Church, "Sivişli Kilise"
 Koç Church
 Cathedral of Selime
 The rock monastery of Selime, one of the largest religious buildings in Cappadocia.
 Kızıl Kilise, "St. Spyridon Church" - a 5th or 6th century church (with an inscription dated to 1084) in the village of Sivrihisar.
 St. Analipsis Church, "Yüksek Kilise" (High Church) on the hill of Analipsis. Stone age relics have been found nearby.
 St. Gregorius Church, "Kilise Cami" - another rock-hewn church, in use today as a mosque
 Kalburlu Kilisesi ('Sieve church', also called St. Epthemios Church').
 Kömürlü Kilise, in the Monastery valley close to the Kalburlu church.
 Çömlekçi Kilise, near the Koç church.

Other places of interest include:
 The tomb of Selime Sultan in the village of Selime.
 Linseed House, "Bezirhane" in the village of Belisırma.
 The Priests House, also known as Papaz Evi.
 Ziga thermal springs, "Ziga kaplıcaları" is located in the village of Yaprakhisar very close to Ihlara Valley.
 Güzelyurt Pond Dam (Göleti)
 An underground city is situated in Gaziemir village of Güzelyurt.

Image gallery

See also
 Cappadocian Greeks
 Cappadocia
 Saint Gregory of Nazianzus

References

External links

 Municipality's official website 
 Aksaray governor's office 
  
 

Populated places in Güzelyurt District, Aksaray
Towns in Turkey